USS Kansas City (AOR-3) was the third of the s. She was the second ship to be named for the city of Kansas City, Missouri.

The keel was laid on 18 April 1968 at the Fore River Shipyard in Quincy, Massachusetts, and the ship was launched on 1 June 1969. The ship was commissioned on 6 June 1970 and saw service in the Vietnam War and Gulf Wars. Subsequently, the ship was decommissioned on 7 October 1994, and was stricken from the Naval Vessel Register on 8 April 1997. In 2013 she was broken up at All Star Metals, Brownsville, Texas .

Awards 
Navy Unit Commendation (Battle Group Echo in Operation Desert Storm)
Meritorious Unit Commendation 
National Defense Service Medal with star
Vietnam Campaign Medal with three battle stars
Southwest Asia Service Medal

References

 
 USS Kansas City (AOR-3)

 

Ships built in Quincy, Massachusetts
Cold War auxiliary ships of the United States
Vietnam War auxiliary ships of the United States
1969 ships
Wichita-class replenishment oilers
Gulf War ships of the United States